Coralee Jane O'Rourke is a former Australian politician. She was the Labor member for Mundingburra in the Queensland Legislative Assembly from 2015 until retirement in 2020.

Early life and education 
O'Rourke attended Queensland University of Technology and completed a bachelor's degree in Education (Early Childhood) and was the Director of a community-based early learning centre in Aitkenvale (Townsville) prior to her election to Parliament on 31 January 2015.

Political career
O'Rourke was sworn in as Minister for Disability Services, Minister for Seniors and Minister Assisting the Premier on North Queensland in the Palaszczuk Ministry on 16 February 2015.

She currently lives in Townsville with her husband and their two teenaged children.

On 5 September 2020, O'Rourke announced that she would not be running in the 2020 Queensland election.

Personal life
On 24 October 2018, O'Rourke publicly announced that she had been diagnosed with breast cancer a week earlier.

References 

Year of birth missing (living people)
Living people
Members of the Queensland Legislative Assembly
Australian Labor Party members of the Parliament of Queensland
Labor Left politicians
21st-century Australian politicians
Women members of the Queensland Legislative Assembly
21st-century Australian women politicians